Abdelbaki Benziane is an Algerian government minister. He took office at the Ministry of Higher Education and Scientific Research (Arabic:وزارة التعليم العالي والبحث العلمي), in Algiers, Algeria on June 25, 2020

Background 
Date of birth : 12 December 1958. Abdelbaki Benziane is a professor in Research field Management Sciences. Among his duties his works mainly covered the fields of University Governance, Human Resources Management, Public Management, Energy Management, Tourism Management.

Career 

 33 years of experience in higher education in management sciences.
 32 years of experience in the management of higher education structures (Institute, University, University Academy, Higher School, Regional Conference of Universities,...).
 Member of the Bureau of several international research networks.
 International expert in evaluation  and governance.
 Member of National Commissions  for Higher Education and Research.
 Project leader of several CNEPRU research projects related to governance and evaluation.

References 

Year of birth missing (living people)
Living people